Axillary lymphadenopathy is lymphadenopathy of the axillary lymph nodes.

Causes
 Cat scratch fever
 Brucellosis
 Lymphoma
 Rheumatoid arthritis

Diagnosis
To diagnose this condition, scans or other imaging tests are used. Enlarged nodes in the vicinity of cancer areas could potentially contain cancer.
Probable patients are observed for few weeks until the cause of lymphadenopathy becomes obvious and they are instructed to return to the doctor if there is increase in node size. Biopsy should be performed in case tests suggest malignancy.

Treatment

References

Diseases of veins, lymphatic vessels and lymph nodes